Helen Oyeyemi FRSL (born 10 December 1984) is a British novelist and writer of short stories.

Life
Oyeyemi was born in Nigeria and was raised in Lewisham, South London from when she was four. Oyeyemi wrote her first novel, The Icarus Girl, while studying for her A-levels at Cardinal Vaughan Memorial School. She attended Corpus Christi College, Cambridge. Since 2014 her home has been in Prague.

Career 
While she was in college, Oyeyemi's plays Juniper's Whitening and Victimese were performed by fellow students and later published by Methuen in 2014. In 2007, Bloomsbury published Oyeyemi's second novel, The Opposite House, which is inspired by Cuban mythology. Her third novel, White Is for Witching, was published by Picador in May 2009. It was a 2009 Shirley Jackson Award finalist and won a 2010 Somerset Maugham Award. In 2009, Oyeyemi was recognized as one of the women on Venus Zine's "25 under 25" list. 

Her fourth novel, Mr Fox, was published by Picador in June 2011, In 2013 she was included in the Granta Best of Young British Novelists list. Her fifth novel, Boy, Snow, Bird, was published by Picador in 2014. Boy, Snow, Bird was a finalist for the Los Angeles Times Book Prize in 2014.

Oyeyemi was a judge on the Booktrust Independent Foreign Fiction Prize for 2015, and served as a judge for the 2015 Scotiabank Giller Prize.

Oyeyemi published What Is Not Yours Is Not Yours, a story collection, in 2016. What Is Not Yours Is Not Yours won the 2016 PEN Open Book Award: for an exceptional book-length work of literature by an author of colour. Oyeyemi was a judge for the 2018 International Booker Prize.

Gingerbread, a novel, was published 5 March 2019. Peaces, a novel, was published 1 April 2021.

Bibliography

Novels
The Icarus Girl (2005)
The Opposite House (2007)
White Is for Witching (2009)
Mr. Fox (2011)
Boy, Snow, Bird (2014)
Gingerbread (2019)
Peaces (2021)

Plays
Juniper's Whitening (2004)
Victimese (2005)

Short story collections
 What Is Not Yours Is Not Yours (2016)

References

External links
"Too Talented to be This Young" from The Globe and Mail.
"Helen Oyeyemi on haunted house novels", La Clé des Langues, 28 August 2012.
Author Page on PEN American Center website.
Author Page on picador.com.
"i live with him, i see his face, i go no more away" (short story, New Statesman, 18 December 1996.
Author Page on AALBC.com website.
"A Muse Gets Mad In Oyeyemi's Magical 'Mr. Fox'" (interview), NPR Books, 2 October 2011.

1984 births
Living people
Black British women writers
Alumni of Corpus Christi College, Cambridge
English people of Yoruba descent
Fellows of the Royal Society of Literature
Writers from London
Nigerian emigrants to the United Kingdom
British women novelists
Yoruba women writers
21st-century British novelists
21st-century British women writers
21st-century British short story writers
Weird fiction writers